Barend Jan (Baas) Terwiel (born 24 November 1941) is a Dutch-Australian anthropologist, historian and Thai studies scholar. He has written books on ethnology of Tai peoples and Ahom, the history and culture of Thailand as well as historical travel of Europeans to mainland Southeast Asia. He retired in 2007, although he still writes about Thailand, releasing a new edition of his book Thailand's Political History in 2010. He authored 11 articles over 47 years from 1972 to 2019 for Journal of the Siam Society.

Education 
Terwiel was born in Ginneken near Breda in the Netherlands. After his military service in Netherlands New Guinea, Terwiel had to spend a few days in Bangkok due to a lack of transport capacity, which aroused his interest for Thailand. He completed his studies at the Utrecht University with a candidaats degree in Cultural Anthropology in 1965 and a doctorandus degree in anthropology, Pali and the History of Buddhism in 1967. For his doctoral studies, he moved to the Australian National University where he graduated with a Ph.D. in 1972. For his dissertation project, he had himself ordained as a Buddhist monk and lived for a year in a village monastery in central Thailand to explore ceremonies and religious practice of Thai Buddhism from an inner perspective.

Career 
From 1972 to 1974 Terwiel worked as a coordinator training volunteers at the Dutch Royal Tropical Institute, Amsterdam. Then, he became a lecturer at the Faculty of Asian Studies of the Australian National University in Canberra, where he was promoted to Senior Lecturer in 1982 and Reader in Asian History in 1991. In the same year, he was appointed Professor at the Institute of Ethnology of the Ludwig Maximilian University of Munich, Germany. In 1992, Terwiel moved to the Asia and Africa Institute of the University of Hamburg where he held the Chair of Languages and Cultures of Thailand and Laos until his retirement in 2007.

References

Dutch anthropologists
Australian anthropologists
Thai studies scholars
Historians of Thailand
Academic staff of the University of Hamburg
Academic staff of the Australian National University
Australian National University alumni
1941 births
Living people